Iceland have participated 4 times at the UEFA Women's Championship: Their best achievement is reaching the 
UEFA Women's Championships quarter final in (2009).

UEFA Women's Championship 

*Draws include knockout matches decided on penalty kicks.

References 

Euro
Countries at the UEFA Women's Championship